A majordomo is a person who speaks, makes arrangements, or takes charge for another. Typically, this is the highest (major) person of a household (domūs or domicile) staff, a head servant who acts on behalf of the owner of a large or significant residence.

A majordomo may also, more informally, be someone who oversees the day-to-day responsibilities of a business enterprise. Historically, many institutions and governments – monasteries, cathedrals, and cities – as well as noble and royal houses also had the post of majordomo, who usually was in charge of finances.

Additionally, the Hispanos of New Mexico use the related term mayordomo to refer to the manager of an acequia system for a town or valley.

Etymology 

See also 

 Butler
 Castellan
 Concierge
 Chamberlain
 Kouropalates (curopalate)
 ''Maître d'hôtel
 Mayor of the Palace
 Papal majordomo
 Seneschal
 Steward
 Valet

References 

Court titles
Domestic work